Gonzalo Villar may refer to:
Gonzalo Villar (poet) (born 1968), Chilean poet and lawyer
Gonzalo Villar (footballer) (Gonzalo Villar del Fraile, born 1998), Spanish footballer